Sigurd Lohde (1899–1977) was a German film and television actor.

Selected filmography
 The Daredevil (1931)
 The Leap into the Void (1932)
 Mrs. Lehmann's Daughters (1932)
 Tannenberg (1932)
 The Big Bluff (1933)
 Peter (1934)
 Little Mother (1935)
 Catherine the Last (1936)
 The Bath in the Barn (1956)
 Beloved Corinna (1956)
 And That on Monday Morning (1959)

References

Bibliography
 Youngkin, Stephen. The Lost One: A Life of Peter Lorre. University Press of Kentucky, 2005.

External links

1899 births
1977 deaths
German male film actors
Actors from Weimar